Jazz Composers Workshop is an album featuring jazz bassist Charles Mingus. It combines the earlier album Moods of Mingus with a Wally Cirillo session released earlier on the album Wally Cirillo & Bobby Scott. It was released on the Savoy label.

Reception
The AllMusic review by Scott Yanow stated: "The complex music on this LP finds bassist Charles Mingus looking toward contemporary classical music in some of the rather cool-toned arrangements. It was not until later in 1955 that he found the right combination of influences in which to express himself best but these slightly earlier performances have their moments".

Track listing
All compositions by Charles Mingus, except as indicated
 "Purple Heart" - 5:36 
 "Gregarian Chant" - 2:51 
 "Eulogy for Rudy Williams" - 6:22 
 "Tea for Two" - 6:19 (Irving Caesar, Vincent Youmans) 
 "Smog L.A." - 3:14 (Wally Cirillo) 
 "Level Seven" - 4:17 (Cirillo) 
 "Transeason"  - 4:23 (Cirillo)
 "Rose Geranium" - 4:13 (Cirillo)
 "Getting Together" - 4:41
 "Body and Soul (Alternate Take 1)" - 3:07 On CD reissue

Personnel
Charles Mingus - bass
John LaPorta - clarinet (tracks 1, 2, 4, 9 and 10), alto saxophone (track 3)
Teo Macero - tenor saxophone (tracks 2-10), baritone saxophone (track 1)
George Barrow - tenor saxophone (track 1), baritone saxophone (tracks 2-4, 9 & 10) 
Wally Cirillo (tracks 5-8), Mal Waldron (tracks 2-4, 9 & 10) - piano 
Kenny Clarke (tracks 5-8), Rudy Nichols (tracks 1-4, 9 & 10) - drums

References

Charles Mingus albums
1956 debut albums
Savoy Records albums
Albums produced by Ozzie Cadena